The River Pol, also known as the Polperro River is a small river in southeastern Cornwall. The river rises near the village of Pelynt, and then flows through a steep valley into the hamlet of Crumplehorn before reaching Polperro. Within the village of Polperro it flows alongside a number of buildings and passes under many bridges, before it finally reaches the harbour and flows into the sea.

References

Pol